The 2021–22 season was the 13th season in the existence of RB Leipzig and the club's sixth consecutive season in the top flight of German football. In addition to the domestic league, RB Leipzig participated in this season's editions of the DFB-Pokal, the UEFA Champions League and the UEFA Europa League. This was Jesse Marsch's first season as coach, succeeding Julian Nagelsmann before being sacked mid-season.

Players

First-team squad

Players out on loan

Transfers

In

Out

Pre-season and friendlies

Competitions

Overall record

Bundesliga

League table

Results summary

Results by round

Matches
The league fixtures were announced on 25 June 2021.

DFB-Pokal

UEFA Champions League

Group stage

The draw for the group stage was held on 26 August 2021.

UEFA Europa League

Knockout phase

Knockout round play-offs
The draw for the knockout round play-offs was held on 13 December 2021.

Round of 16
The draw for the round of 16 was held on 25 February 2022. After being drawn against Russian side Spartak Moscow, Leipzig received a bye to the next round following Spartak's expulsion by UEFA and FIFA due to the Russian invasion of Ukraine.

Quarter-finals
The draw for the quarter-finals was held on 18 March 2022.

Semi-finals
The draw for the semi-finals was held on 18 March 2022, after the quarter-final draw.

Statistics

Appearances and goals 

|-
! colspan=14 style=background:#dcdcdc; text-align:center| Goalkeepers

|-
! colspan=14 style=background:#dcdcdc; text-align:center| Defenders

 
|-
! colspan=14 style=background:#dcdcdc; text-align:center| Midfielders

 

 

|-
! colspan=14 style=background:#dcdcdc; text-align:center| Forwards

|-
! colspan=14 style=background:#dcdcdc; text-align:center| Players transferred out during the season 

 

|-

Goalscorers

Notes

References

RB Leipzig seasons
RB Leipzig
RB Leipzig
RB Leipzig